Holany is a market town in Česká Lípa District in the Liberec Region of the Czech Republic. It has about 500 inhabitants.

Administrative parts
Villages of Hostíkovice, Loubí, Oslovice and Rybnov are administrative parts of Holany.

References

Market towns in the Czech Republic